Trans-e-motion is a nonprofit organization located in Fresno, California, it was founded in 2005 and was incorporated in 2010. The organization serves the local transgender and gender nonconforming community in Fresno by providing social spaces, support groups, and advocating for trans issues. Additionally the organization participates in events such as Transgender Day of Remembrance and Transgender Day Of Visibility.

References 

Transgender organizations in the United States
Organizations based in Fresno, California